The 2015 Tucson mayoral election was held on November 3, 2015. It saw the reelection of incumbent Jonathan Rothschild.

Primaries 
Primaries were held August 25, 2015. One candidate ran in the Democratic primary, while none ran in either the Libertarian or Republican primaries.

Democratic primary

Libertarian primary

Republican primary

General election

References

2015
Tucson
Tucson